Harvey Bland Morgan (born August 18, 1930) is an American politician. From 1980–2012 he served in the Virginia House of Delegates, representing the 98th district on the Middle Peninsula. He is a member of the Republican Party.

Notes

References

External links

1930 births
Living people
Republican Party members of the Virginia House of Delegates
Hampden–Sydney College alumni
Medical College of Virginia alumni
People from Gloucester Courthouse, Virginia
21st-century American politicians
20th-century American politicians